The Leicester Mercury is a British regional newspaper for the city of Leicester and the neighbouring counties of Leicestershire and Rutland. The paper began in the 19th century as the Leicester Daily Mercury and later changed to its present title.

Early history
The paper was founded by James Thompson, already proprietor of the Leicester Chronicle which he had merged with the Leicestershire Mercury ten years earlier. The Leicester Daily Mercury would be an evening paper, the first to be published in Leicester, and give extra support to the Liberal Party in the forthcoming general election. The first issue was published on 31 January 1874 from the paper's offices at 3 St Martin's, consisting of four pages of five columns each. The paper had a staff of 25 and a circulation of 5000.

Recent history
Along with the rest of Britain's regional daily press, the Leicester Mercury has struggled in circulation terms over the past two decades. The paper had an average circulation of 69,069 per day in the first half of 2008, down from 73,634 per day the previous year. This represents a year-on-year decline of some 5.7% and a drop of 47% when compared with a sale of 139,357 copies in the equivalent audit period for 1989.

The newspaper is the sixth largest-selling regional title in England. In 2001, after a re-design and relaunch, it was named Regional Newspaper of the Year. In 2006 the paper attempted to reduce costs by ceasing publication of its localised weekday editions for Loughborough, Hinckley, North West Leicestershire, Melton Mowbray and Market Harborough. They have been replaced with two general editions, covering the east and west of Leicestershire respectively. There are however still two editions published daily to cover the city of Leicester itself. The Mercury has retained its reporting staff in each of the market towns, despite substantial editorial staff cuts in other areas – achieved through non-replacement of departing staff. The company also closed its Sports Mercury edition due to declining readership, and the fact ABC rules no longer permitted the paper to include the sport paper's sales within the circulation figure for the main daily editions. In addition, the paper relaunched its Sporting Blue sports newspaper with tête-bêche binding to cover the city's two major sports teams; Leicester City and Leicester Tigers.

From January 2010 to September 2011 the paper also championed its own youth paper: The Leicester WAVE which appeared as a supplement on the last Wednesday of every month. Its content was entirely written by people under the age of 25, often taking unique angles on some of the Mercury's hard hitting stories by illustrating how they would affect young people. During 2011 it was edited by Sam Newton.

Since June 2016 the paper has been edited by George Oliver, who took over the editorship following the resignation of Kevin Booth for personal reasons earlier in the year.

The newspaper's headquarters underwent a complete external transformation, at a reported cost of £12.5m, and has now reopened to the general public. The new-look building is in keeping with the city's plans for an "office core" close to the Mercury'''s head office.  However, in April 2009, some of the back-end production work was moved to a hub in Nottingham which also carries out work for the Nottingham Post and the Derby Telegraph.  However,  about 60 journalists remain in the main Leicester office. In 2016 it was reported that Trinity Mirror had put the third floor of the paper's iconic building up for let and that consequently in 2017 all of the papers journalists would be moved to a new office.   All of the newspaper's reporters remain in Leicester or other Leicestershire towns, as do the sports writers, photographers and feature writers, along with the proofing function.

The offices were moved to New Walk from Mercury Place in March 2017.

In December 2006, it was reported that 79% of the Mercury'''s workforce had voted in favour of National Union of Journalists recognition, the paper being only the second Northcliffe Newspapers chapel to win union representation.

In 2012, Local World acquired Northcliffe Media from Daily Mail and General Trust. It was sold again in 2015 to Trinity Mirror.

Editors 

 James Thompson (1874 - 1877)
 Francis Hewitt (1877 – 1882)
 Harry Hackett (1882 – 1923)
 Vernon Hewitt (1923 – ????)
 John Fortune (1952 – 1974)
 Neville Stack (1974 – 1987)
 Alex Leys (1987 – 1993)
 Nick Carter (1993 – 2009)
 Keith Perch (2009 – 2011)
 Richard Bettsworth (2011 – 2014)
 Kevin Booth (2014 – 2016)
 George Oliver (2016 - 2020)
 Adam Moss (2020–present)

References

External links
 Leicester Mercury Website

Companies based in Leicester
Newspapers published in Leicestershire
Northcliffe Media
Daily newspapers published in the United Kingdom
Newspapers published by Reach plc